The 1943 Missouri Tigers football team was an American football team that represented the University of Missouri in the Big Six Conference (Big 6) during the 1943 college football season. The team compiled a 6–3 record (3–2 against Big 6 opponents), finished in a tie for second place in the Big 6, and outscored all opponents by a combined total of 170 to 142. Chauncey Simpson was the head coach for the first of three seasons. The team played its home games at Memorial Stadium in Columbia, Missouri.

The team's leading scorers were Bill Dellastatious and Don Reece, each with 36 points.

Don Faurot, who had been the team's head coach since 1935, stepped down in June 1943 to join the United States Navy during World War II. Chauncey Simpson, who had been the school's head track coach and a backfield coach for the football team, was appointed to serve as "acting football coach" during Faurot's military service. Simpson remained in charge of the team for three years from 1943 to 1945.

Schedule

References

Missouri
Missouri Tigers football seasons
Missouri Tigers football